John William Harrington (25 November 1896 – 1994) was an English footballer who played in the Football League for Northampton Town and Wolverhampton Wanderers.

References

1896 births
1994 deaths
English footballers
Association football forwards
English Football League players
Hednesford Town F.C. players
Wolverhampton Wanderers F.C. players
Northampton Town F.C. players
Brierley Hill Alliance F.C. players